General elections were held in Tonga on 14 and 15 February 1990 to elect members of the Legislative Assembly of Tonga.  Nine nobles and nine people's representatives were elected.  Seven of the latter favoured democratic reform. Voter turnout was 65.4%.

Background
The 1987 Tongan general election saw the election of Laki Niu and ʻAkilisi Pōhiva and an increased focus on accountability for the government, particularly in the areas of parliamentary allowances, passport sales, and financial management. After a series of evasive Ministerial answers and Ministers using international travel to avoid being questioned entirely, in September 1989 all the elected People's Representatives walked out, returning only when they would have forfeited their seats. On their return, they introduced motions calling for a reduction in the number of Noble Representatives and an increase in the number of People's Representatives. The first was voted down, and the second subsequently withdrawn.

Campaign
Parliament was closed on 29 October 1989. During December and January conservatives led by Lord Fusituʻa attempted to enlist the church to back a "church and state" campaign and formed a de facto political party. In January 1990 King Tāufaʻāhau Tupou IV intervened in the election, giving an interview to Matangi Tonga in which he complained about the walkout and said that change could become uncontrollable and result in a Coup d'état. The Times of Tonga reported that claims that reformers were communists attempting to overthrow the government was a campaign of fear. Two days before the election an attempt was made to nullify the candidacies of two reformist candidates on the grounds of debt; the debts were immediately paid and they remained on the ballot.

Results

People's seats

References

Tonga
1990 in Tonga
Elections in Tonga
May 1990 events in Oceania